Dabhadi is a small town in Malegaon taluka of Nashik district in the Indian state of Maharashtra. It is located on Maharashtra State Highway 19 between the towns of Malegaon and Satana.

Before the delimitation of Vidhan Sabha constituencies in 2008, Dabhadi was the constituency number 74 of Maharashtra Legislative Assembly between 1977 to 2004.

References

Cities and towns in Nashik district